Nateglinide (INN, trade name Starlix) is a drug for the treatment of type 2 diabetes. Nateglinide was developed by Ajinomoto, a Japanese company and sold by the Swiss pharmaceutical company Novartis.

Nateglinide belongs to the meglitinide class of blood glucose-lowering drugs.

Pharmacology
Nateglinide lowers blood glucose by stimulating the release of insulin from the pancreas. It achieves this by closing ATP-dependent potassium channels in the membrane of the β cells. This depolarizes the β cells and causes voltage-gated calcium channels to open. The resulting calcium influx induces fusion of insulin-containing vesicles with the cell membrane, and insulin secretion occurs.

Contraindications
Nateglinide is contraindicated in patients who:
 have known hypersensitivity to the compound or any ingredient in the formulation.
 are affected with type 1 (namely insulin-dependent) diabetes mellitus.
 are in diabetic ketoacidosis.

Comparisons with other drugs for type 2 diabetes
A study funded by Novo Nordisk, the U.S. distributor for Repaglinide, compared their product with Nateglinide in "A randomized, parallel-group, open-label, multicenter 16-week clinical trial". They concluded that the two were similar, but "repaglinide monotherapy was significantly more effective than nateglinide monotherapy in reducing HbA1c and FPG values after 16 weeks of therapy."

Dosage
Nateglinide is delivered in 60 mg & 120 mg tablet form.

See also 
Repaglinide

References

External links 
Starlix - website of the manufacturer.
How Nateglinide Works - website of the manufacturer.

Potassium channel blockers
Meglitinides
Carboxamides
Isopropyl compounds
Cyclohexanes